LS 5039 is a binary system in the constellation of Scutum. It has an apparent magnitude of 11.27, and it is about 8,200 light-years away.

LS 5039 consists of a massive O-type main-sequence star, and a compact object (likely a black hole) that emits HE (high energy) and VHE (very high energy) gamma rays. It is one of the only three known star systems of this kind, together with LS I +61 303 and PSR B1259-63. The two objects orbit each other every 3.9 days, along a moderately eccentric orbit. Additionally, it is one of the few massive X-ray binaries known to be associated with radio emission.

References

External links
Discovery of Very High Energy Gamma Rays Associated with an X-ray Binary (Science Express) July 7, 2005
Astronomers Discovery Very High Energy Gamma-ray Emission From Microquasar (ScienceDaily) May 19, 2006

See also
LS I +61 303, the only other known VHE gamma ray producing system

Microquasars
Scuti, V479
Scutum (constellation)
TIC objects